Penitent Magdalene is a painting by the Italian artist Artemisia Gentileschi. It hangs in Seville Cathedral. It has probably been in the cathedral since the late 17th century.  She returned to the subject later in the 1620s in Mary Magdalene as Melancholy.

Provenance
The painting's first home was the collection of Fernando Enriquez Afan de Ribera, the 3rd Duke of Alcala, from 1626 to 1637. He purchased the painting in Rome while he was ambassador to the Holy See during 1625-1626. In 1626, he became viceroy of Naples, and then later returned to Seville in 1631.

References

Sources 

1610 paintings
Paintings by Artemisia Gentileschi
Paintings depicting Mary Magdalene